Andreasson is a surname. Notable people with the surname include:

 Egon Andreasson (1910–1983), Swedish politician
 Knut Olaf Andreasson Strand (1887–1980), Norwegian politician for the Liberal Party
 Marcus Andreasson (born 1978), Swedish footballer
 Martin Andreasson, born 1970, is a Swedish Liberal People's Party politician, member of the Riksdag 2002–2006
 Mattias Andréasson (born 1981), Swedish singer and Swedish Idol 2007 contestant
 Pontus Andreasson (born 1998), Swedish ice hockey player
 Rikard Andreasson (born 1979), Swedish cross country skier who has competed since 2000
 Rune Andréasson (1925–1999), Swedish comic creator
 Veronica Andrèasson (born 1981), Swedish road cyclist

See also 
 Andreasson BA-11, acrobatic biplane designed for homebuilding
 Andreasson BA-4B, single-seat aerobatic biplane marketed for homebuilding
 Andreassen
 Andreessen (disambiguation)
 Andriessen
 Andresen
 Andersen

References 

Patronymic surnames